John Bovee Dods (1795 – 21 March 1872) was a philosopher, spiritualist, mesmerist, and early psychologist. He was born in New York City and died in Brooklyn, but much of his productive life was spent in Maine.

In 1830, Dods spent 10 weeks in Richmond, Virginia organizing Unitarians and Universalists into a single church, The First Unitarian Universalist Church of Richmond. This is believed to have been the first instance of the 2 faiths combining together into one organization, presaging the formation of the Unitarian Universalist Association by 130 years. However, due to a tremendous outcry from Richmond's mainline Christians, the church was forced to change its name after Dods had left to First Independent Christian Church in 1833. The same church group continues today as First Unitarian Universalist Church of Richmond. As Dods did not accept the offer to be pastor of the church, he instead recommended John Budd Pitkin. Dods himself returned to Maine, and later moved to Massachusetts where he preached, wrote, and founded a school. It was here where Dods became interested in spiritualism and psychic phenomenon.

His Universalist preaching in Massachusetts was short lived. He began to theorize that animal magnetism put humans in touch with the divine, and in some ways was a precursor of New Thought theories. He published his book Spirit Manifestations in 1854, and officially became a spiritualist. Dods became one of the more well known mesmerists in New England, along with others such as La Roy Sunderland, Joseph Rodes Buchanan, and Phineas Parkhurst Quimby.

Dods was a prolific writer. He published works such as Twenty-Four Short Sermons on the Doctrine of Universal Salvation (1832), Thirty Sermons (1840), Six Lectures on the Philosophy of Mesmerism (1849), The Philosophy of Electrical Psychology (1850), Immortality Triumphant (1852), and Spirit Manifestations: Examined and Explained (1854).

References

Further reading
 Appleton's Cyclopedia
 The Gospel Of Jesus (1858) Edited By Rev Gibson Smith contains an Editorial Preface By John Bovee Dods

External links
 John Bovee Dods, Electrical Psychologist
 
 

People from Penobscot County, Maine
American psychologists
American spiritualists
1795 births
1872 deaths